Molly White may refer to:

 Molly White (politician) (born 1958), American politician in the Texas House of Representatives
 Molly White (writer) (born 1993), American software engineer, Wikipedia editor, and cryptocurrency critic
 Molly White, fictional character in the 1928 American drama film The Hound of Silver Creek
 Molly White, fictional character in the 2000 TV movie Trapped in a Purple Haze
 Molly White, or the Bride Bewitched, 1767 verse by Dominick Kelly